In chemistry, ethenium, protonated ethylene or ethyl cation is a positive ion with the formula . It can be viewed as a molecule of ethylene with one added proton, or a molecule of ethane minus one hydride ion. It is a carbocation; more specifically, a nonclassical carbocation.

Preparation
Ethenium has been observed in rarefied gases subjected to radiation.

The reaction is much faster at 90 °C.

Stability and reactions

Structure
The structure of ethenium's ground state was in dispute for many years, but it was eventually agreed to be a non-classical structure, with the two carbon atoms and one of the hydrogen atoms forming a three-center two-electron bond.  Calculations have shown that higher homologues, like the propyl and n-butyl cations also have bridged structures.  Generally speaking, bridging appears to be a common means by which 1° alkyl carbocations achieve additional stabilization.  Consequently, true 1° carbocations (with a classical structure) may be rare or nonexistent.

References

Carbocations
Physical chemistry